The 1988 Danish 1st Division season was the 43rd season of the Danish 1st Division league championship, governed by the Danish Football Association.

The Danish champions qualified for the European Cup 1989-90 qualification, while the second placed team qualified for the qualification round of the UEFA Cup 1989-90. The two lowest placed teams of the tournament was directly relegated to the Danish 2nd Division. Likewise, the Danish 2nd Division champions and runners-up were promoted to the 1st Division.

Table

Results

Top goalscorers

External links
  Peders Fodboldstatistik

Danish 1st Division seasons
Dan
Dan
1
Top level Danish football league seasons